Donald John Graham (born January 31, 1964) is a former American football linebacker in the National Football League (NFL) for the Tampa Bay Buccaneers, the Buffalo Bills, and the Washington Redskins.  He played college football at Penn State University and was drafted in the fourth round of the 1987 NFL Draft.

1964 births
Living people
American football linebackers
Players of American football from Pittsburgh
Tampa Bay Buccaneers players
Buffalo Bills players
Washington Redskins players
Penn State Nittany Lions football players